Ted Nash (born 1991) is an English Internet and mobile media entrepreneur best known for launching the site Little Gossip Nash is also known for developing various apps and websites and for his public speaking.

Personal life

In 1991, Edward John Nash was born in Taunton, Somerset, United Kingdom to parents Andy and Linda.

Serial entrepreneur 
Nash is known as a serial entrepreneur and has been covered extensively as being an entrepreneur at a very young age. Before the age of 15, he had created the search engine, SurfPony.com, a cloud storage platform UploadPod.com, travel agency TravelArena, and music site Clastaz.com. Nash's notable endeavours have met with varying degrees of success. He sold Little Gossip for a "nominal fee" after receiving "negative publicity in the tabloid press",

Little Gossip

In 2010, Nash launched Little Gossip, a controversial site that allows users to anonymously post rumours about their school peers. The site was subject to public criticism from parents, teachers and school administrators. The website also received coverage from BBC Panorama and BBC Radio. It was sold to Platinum Century in 2011.

Liquid5

Nash is CEO of Liquid5 with Fit or Fugly app allowed iPhone users to calculate the attractiveness of the human face using Fibonacci's golden ratio. It judges the symmetry of the face in an uploaded photo based on the key anchor points of nose, mouth, ears, chin and eyes.

Tapdaq
Nash founded Tapdaq, a mobile advertising exchange, in 2013 and acts as the company's CEO. Tapdaq raised $1.4 million in capital in 2014 to fund commercialisation of its in-app advertising exchange.

References

External links
Ted Nash Official site

1991 births
Living people
English businesspeople
British technology company founders